The Great Gorge Route or Niagara Belt Line was an interurban trolley belt line encompassing the Niagara Gorge, operated by the International Railway and Niagara Gorge Railroad. Many dignitaries rode this line and they used to use a flat car with search light to illuminate the Niagara Whirlpool at night (during the tourist season).

Beginning
In 1895, the International Railway Company (IRC) established the Great Gorge Route scenic attraction. This electric trolley line ran from Niagara Falls (Prospect Park) to Lewiston, NY along the banks of the Niagara River. The trolley line ceased in 1935, as did other interurban lines, victims to the Depression and the change in tourist transportation preferences (bus and automobile).

The route
The Canadian route ran from Niagara Falls, Ontario to Queenston, Ontario with a bridge crossing at Queenston.  This side was on the top of the Gorge.

The American side ran in the gorge from Youngstown, New York to Niagara Falls, New York, where it gradually ascended to cross the Upper Steel Arch Bridge.  On the way it passed under the Whirlpool Rapids Bridge and the Michigan Central Railway Bridge.

Rolling stock

References

External links
 Images from the Niagara Falls Public Library (Ont.)

Defunct New York (state) railroads
Defunct Ontario railways
Interurban railways in New York (state)
Interurban railways in Ontario
Electric railways in Canada
Closed railway lines in the United States